Ruth Kadiri (born 24 March 1988) is a Nigerian actress, screenwriter and film producer.

Early and personal life
Ruth Kadiri was born on 24 March, 1988 in Benin City, Edo State, Nigeria. She was first child of two children, her father name was Desmond Kadiri. She studied Mass Communication at the University of Lagos and Business Administration at Yaba College of Technology.

The actress kept her love life private until December 2017, when she announced that she was engaged on social media. 

On August 26, 2019, Kadiri gave birth to her first child. On July 20, 2022, she gave birth to her second child.

Career
Kadiri ventured into Nollywood in the movie Boys Cot and since then has over fifty movies to her credit. As a screenwriter, Ruth Kadiri has written and co-written several movies including Matters Arising, Heart of a Fighter, Ladies Men, Sincerity, First Class and Over the Edge. Ruth also produced films such as Matters Arising, Over the Edge, Somebody Lied and Memory Lane, which deals with the issue of lies and deceit.

Filmography
 In Your Arms (2017)
 Black Bride (2017)
 We Cheats More (2017)
 WET by Ruth Kadiri (2018)
 Tripod by Ruth Kadiri (2018)
 Black Men Rock (2018)
 Sex & Love (2018)
 Love is Beautiful (2019)
 Tender lies (2019)
 Unfounded (2019)
 Murder Call (2019)
 Stab (2019)
 The Final List (2019)
 The Dumb Wife (2020)
 Too Old for Love (2020)
 Tears of Rejected Seed (2020)
 Babies and friends (2020)
 Too old for this (2020)
 Shrine Girl (2020)
 Space Out (2020)
 Dumb wife (2020)
 Larry Cold (2021)
 Pair (2021)
 Adunni (2021)
 Talking chances (2021)
 Love Me (2021)
 Craving (2021)
 5 is company (2021)
 Out of Love (2021)
 Nasty Jane(2021)
 Boiling point (2021)
 Everybody wants Alvin (2022)
 Something Fishy (2022)

Awards and nominations

See also
 List of Nigerian film producers

References

External links

1988 births
Living people
21st-century Nigerian actresses
Actresses from Benin City
Actresses from Edo State
Nigerian film actresses
Nigerian film producers
University of Lagos alumni
Yaba College of Technology alumni
Nigerian screenwriters
Nigerian film award winners